The 1947 Southern Jaguars football team was an American football team that represented Southern University in the 1947 college football season. In their 12th season under head coach Ace Mumford, the Jaguars compiled a 10–2 record, won the SWAC championship, shut out eight of 12 opponents, defeated  in the Creole Classic and Fort Valley State in the Yam Bowl, and outscored all opponents by a total of 380 to 53. The team played its home games at University Stadium in Baton Rouge, Louisiana.

Southern ranked No. 8 among the nation's black college football teams according to the Pittsburgh Courier and its Dickinson Rating System.

Schedule

References

Southern
Southern Jaguars football seasons
Southwestern Athletic Conference football champion seasons
Southern Jaguars football